Robert John Barnshaw (14 March 1889 – 30 January 1974) was an English professional association footballer who played as a centre half in The Football League for Sheffield United, Watford and Aberdare Athletic.

After starting his career at hometown club Hebburn Argyle Barnshaw moved to Sheffield Wednesday but an injury prevented him from ever playing in the first team. Barnshaw returned to Hebburn Argyle despite Wednesday retaining his registration. He eventually transferred to Sheffield United for a total of £90 split between his two previous clubs.

After failing to make the break into the first team at Bramall Lane Barnshaw was sold to Watford after just one season for £50.  During his first season at Watford, he played 11 games during Watford's 1914–15 title-winning season. He also played as a guest for Leeds City and Darlington during the First World War. before finishing his career at Aberdare Athletic.

References 

1889 births
1974 deaths
People from Hebburn
Footballers from Tyne and Wear
English footballers
Association football midfielders
Hebburn Argyle F.C. players
Sheffield Wednesday F.C. players
Sheffield United F.C. players
Watford F.C. players
Aberdare Athletic F.C. players
English Football League players
Southern Football League players
Leeds City F.C. wartime guest players
Darlington F.C. wartime guest players